Álvaro Iglesias Marcos (born 1 March 1993) is a Spanish field hockey player who plays as a midfielder or forward for División de Honor club Club de Campo and the Spain national team.

At the 2016 Summer Olympics, he competed for the national team in the men's tournament.

International career
Álvaro played for the Spain U21 team from 2013 until 2014 before he made his debut for the main team in 2014 in a test match against Great Britain. He was part of the Spain squad that finished thirteenth at the 2018 World Cup. He scored two goals in three games in that tournament. At the 2019 EuroHockey Championship, he won his first medal with the national team as they finished second. On 25 May 2021, he was selected in the squad for the 2021 EuroHockey Championship.

References

External links

1993 births
Living people
Spanish male field hockey players
Male field hockey midfielders
Male field hockey forwards
Field hockey players from Madrid
Field hockey players at the 2016 Summer Olympics
2018 Men's Hockey World Cup players
Field hockey players at the 2020 Summer Olympics
Olympic field hockey players of Spain
Club de Campo Villa de Madrid players
KHC Dragons players
División de Honor de Hockey Hierba players
Men's Belgian Hockey League players
Expatriate field hockey players
Spanish expatriate sportspeople in Belgium
2023 Men's FIH Hockey World Cup players